Jagara, commonly known as Jagra, is a census village in Nalbari district, Assam, India. According to the 2011 Census of India, Jagra has a total population of 6,842 people, including 3,586 males and 3,256 females.

Like other places in North-east India, the village also carries a history of militancy.

References 

Villages in Nalbari district